This was the second edition of the Neox Fan Awards, created by Atresmedia and Fanta for teenage audiences to honor the best of the year in films, television, music and sports. The show featured live performances by Abraham Mateo, Rasel & Jadel, Chenoa and Auryn. Also, show hosts Anna Simon and Arturo Valls appeared in disguise as Christina Aguilera and Pitbull, performing a rendition of their hit Feel This Moment.

Awards

Film

Music

Television

Neox awards

References

2013 awards